Euhadra nachicola is a species of air-breathing land snail, a terrestrial pulmonate gastropod mollusk in the family Bradybaenidae. This species is endemic to Japan.

References

Euhadra
Molluscs of Japan
Gastropods described in 1929
Taxa named by Nagamichi Kuroda
Taxonomy articles created by Polbot